Coverciano may refer to:

Coverciano, Florence, a neighbourhood of Florence
Centro Tecnico Federale di Coverciano, the training ground in Coverciano for the Italy national team